Tiensuu is a Finnish surname. Notable people with the surname include:

Jukka Tiensuu (born 1948), Finnish composer, harpsichordist, pianist, and conductor
Tuukka Tiensuu (born 1976), Finnish TV-director, writer and producer

Finnish-language surnames